Monument to Soldiers Liberators is located in Chernihiv, Ukraine, in Victory Square in front of Chernihiv–Ovruch railway and nearby Lokomotiv stadium.

History
It was erected in 1968 and it is a tank mounted on a granite pedestal, divisions that took part in the battles for the liberation of the city are embossed in gold letters. The main element of the composition is the legendary T-34 tank - a Soviet medium tank during the Great Patriotic War, the most massive medium tank of the Second World War. Combat vehicles of this series were the first to break into Chernigov, occupied by the Nazis.
There are legends in the city about the tank installed on the Circle:

 This is the first tank to break into Chernihiv.
 The inscription "For the Motherland!" on the left side of the tower - during the Great Patriotic War, it was found under layers of paint.
 If you fill in the solarium and put the batteries in, the tank will go.
 The tank is not securely closed, homeless people were sleeping in it

Gallery

References

External links 
 wikimapia.org

Tourist attractions in Chernihiv
Tourist attractions in Chernihiv Oblast
Buildings and structures in Chernihiv
Monuments and memorials in Ukraine
Monuments and memorials in Chernihiv
Tourism in Chernihiv